is a former Japanese football player and manager. He played for Japan national team. He also managed Japan women's national team.

Club career
Miyauchi was born in Tokyo on November 26, 1959. After graduating from high school, he joined Furukawa Electric in 1978. Initially, he could not play in many games for injury. In 1982, the club won JSL Cup. From 1983, he played as regular player and the club won 1985–86 Japan Soccer League and 1986 JSL Cup. He was also selected Best Eleven in 1985–86 and 1986–87. In Asia, the club won 1986 Asian Club Championship. This is first Asian champions as Japanese club. He retired in 1988. He played 114 games and scored 6 goals in the league.

National team career
In August 1979, Miyauchi was selected Japan U-20 national team for 1979 World Youth Championship. But he did not play in the match. On September 30, 1984, he debuted for Japan national team against South Korea. He played at 1986 World Cup qualification, 1986 Asian Games and 1988 Summer Olympics qualification. He played 20 games for Japan until 1987.

Coaching career
After retirement, in 1989, Miyauchi became a manager for L.League club Prima Ham FC Kunoichi. The club won 1994 Empress's Cup, 1995 L.League and 1997 L.League Cup. He resigned in 1997. In 1997, he also became a manager for Japan women's national team. He managed at 1997 AFC Women's Championship and 1998 Asian Games. Japan won the 3rd place at both tournament. In 1999, he managed at 1999 World Cup. However Japan was defeated in group stage and failure to qualify for 2000 Summer Olympics. He resigned after 1999 World Cup.

Club statistics

National team statistics

References

External links

 
 Japan National Football Team Database

1959 births
Living people
Association football people from Tokyo
Japanese footballers
Japan international footballers
Japan Soccer League players
JEF United Chiba players
Japanese football managers
Japan women's national football team managers
1999 FIFA Women's World Cup managers
Footballers at the 1986 Asian Games
Association football midfielders
Asian Games competitors for Japan